Pierrefonds Community High School (often abbreviated as PCHS), is a non-denominational, English speaking educational facility located in the Pierrefonds-Roxboro borough of Montreal, Quebec, Canada with an enrollment capacity of approximately 1,200 students, in grades 7 through 11. It operates within the Lester B. Pearson School Board and has functioned as a secondary school since 1971. Having been originally named Pierrefonds Comprehensive High School, the slight name variation was added after the merge with Riverdale High School in 2019. The principal of the school is Lucia V. Coretti.

History 
PCHS began as an academic and vocational high school for both English and French speaking Catholic students to accommodate West Island population expansion at the beginning of the 1970s. Prior to its opening in 1971, established West Island schools such as Saint Thomas High School, located in Pointe-Claire, Quebec, were doubling their enrolments to accommodate Catholic students. Protestant students were already served by Riverdale High School, which opened in 1965. 

Originally conceived under the proposed name of Villa Nova, PCHS opened as Polyvalente de Pierrefonds Comprehensive High School, to better reflect its multi-disciplined approach. In 1979 it ceded half its population when French speaking students moved to the new Polyvalente des Sources high school, located nearby. PCHS remained a Catholic school until 1998, when Quebec's Catholic and Protestant school boards were replaced with a secular, linguistically based system.

In 1994 it began its International Baccalaureate program which continues to this day, and in 1995 undertook a campaign to amend its name, although a strategic focus group decided to keep the name "comprehensive" to reflect both the wide variety of programs and services offered and the commitment to meeting all student needs. In 2001 it celebrated its 30th anniversary and honoured four teachers for their long standing and exceptional educational service and dedication to the school.

In 2019, it was announced by Quebec Education Minister Jean-François Roberge that Riverdale High School would be merging with PCHS in an attempt to deal with overcrowding issues of the Commission scolaire Marguerite-Bourgeoys. Following the merger with Riverdale, the school board renamed the school to "Pierrefonds Community High School".

Architecture

PCHS was built as an "open-concept" over a "reflected plan", meaning that one side mirrors the other, along an axial core. It features a large cafeteria at the center and a gigantic gymnasium, or "field house", at the south end, which is connected by a tunnel. Designed by a California architect, as recommended by the school's first principal Mr. John Oss, it employed industrial visual cues like unfinished concrete walls, exposed ceiling pipes and ducts that were painted primary red, blue and yellow enamel, and small windows that did not open. Walls between adjoining classrooms could be moved to allow for team teaching of up to 4 classes at a time. This was only used in the early years for English Literature classes.  Stylistically it was considered radical for an educational institution at the time, particularly due to the fact that the classrooms had no doors, an experiment that resulted in students sometimes being distracted by people passing by in the halls. The school was still being finished when classes began in the fall of 1971. There are few windows.

PCHS 

Besides its International Baccalaureate program, PCHS participates in an aggressive immersion program, an English program and a Handicapped program. In sports it is a member of the GMAA (Greater Montreal Athletic Association) and is represented by the "Trojans'" who are the Male Athletes and the "Lady Trojans" who are the Female athletes. It has a wide variety of sports for different kinds of interest such as touch football, soccer (indoor/outdoor), track and field (indoor/outdoor), rugby, softball, volleyball, swimming, badminton, tennis etc. One of their coaches is Hank Palmer (Canadien Olympian).

Throughout the years students must choose between three art options: visual arts, drama and music. In grades 7 and 8 students also have the choice of dance as one of their art options. Starting in grade 9 students are allowed to change their art option if the one they chose in grade 7 does not see them fit. In grades 10 and 11 students must choose between CST and SN mathematics courses. It is important for students to choose the proper one since SN mathematics is a prerequisite for certain CEGEP programs. In grade 10 students may choose two classes out of a variety of different classes to go into in grade 11. These classes differ year to year but generally contain: physics, chemistry, biology, psychology, leadership, cooking

Features
 Auditorium: State-of-the-art professional theatre.
 Art facilities: Well-equipped art, drama music rooms.
 Science and technology facilities: 11 science labs, 2 computer labs with 34 computers per lab, computer workstations located in individual classrooms.
 Library: Newly renovated and fully automated library, access to books in French, English and Spanish; equipped with 12 computers.
 Atrium: A place situated next to the library where people may socialize.
 Leadership Program A great leadership program run by Mr. Bertrand

Footnotes

External links
 Official PCHS website

English-language schools in Quebec
Educational institutions established in 1971
High schools in Montreal
International Baccalaureate schools in Quebec
Lester B. Pearson School Board
Pierrefonds-Roxboro
1971 establishments in Quebec